Udmurt-Shagirt is a rural locality (a village) in Shagirtskoye Rural Settlement, Kuyedinsky District, Perm Krai, Russia. The population was 212 as of 2010. There are 5 streets.

Geography 
Udmurt-Shagirt is located 28 km northwest of Kuyeda (the district's administrative centre) by road. Stary Shagirt is the nearest rural locality.

References 

Rural localities in Kuyedinsky District